Franklin Township is one of the sixteen townships of Morrow County, Ohio, United States.  The 2010 census found 1,617 people in the township.

Geography
Located in the eastern part of the county, it borders the following townships:
Congress Township - north
Perry Township - northeast
Middlebury Township, Knox County - east
Wayne Township, Knox County - southeast corner
Chester Township - south
Harmony Township - southwest
Gilead Township - west

No municipalities are located in Franklin Township. Hidden Lakes is a census-designated place in the northwest part of the township.

Name and history
Franklin Township was organized in 1823, and named for Benjamin Franklin. It is one of twenty-one Franklin Townships statewide.

Government
The township is governed by a three-member board of trustees, who are elected in November of odd-numbered years to a four-year term beginning on the following January 1. Two are elected in the year after the presidential election and one is elected in the year before it. There is also an elected township fiscal officer, who serves a four-year term beginning on April 1 of the year after the election, which is held in November of the year before the presidential election. Vacancies in the fiscal officership or on the board of trustees are filled by the remaining trustees.

References

External links
County website

Townships in Morrow County, Ohio
1823 establishments in Ohio
Populated places established in 1823
Townships in Ohio